Thomas or Tommy Sheppard may refer to:
 Thomas Sheppard (cricketer) (1873–1954), English cricketer
 Thomas Sheppard (MP) (1766–1858), Whig (and then Conservative) Member of Parliament (MP) for Frome
Sir Thomas Sheppard, 1st Baronet (died 1821), of the Cotton-Sheppard baronets
Sir Thomas Cotton-Sheppard, 2nd Baronet (1785–1848), of the Cotton-Sheppard baronets
 Thomas Sheppard (curator) (1876–1945), museum founder and curator in Kingston upon Hull, UK
 Tommy Sheppard (politician), Scottish politician
 Tommy Sheppard (basketball), American sports executive

See also 
 Thomas Shepard (disambiguation)
 Thomas Shepherd (disambiguation)
 Sheppard (surname)